Etta Kett is a long-running comic strip created by Paul Robinson, which ran from December 7, 1925 to November 9, 1974.

Publication history 
The original distribution in December 1925 was with the Putnam Syndicate, moving over to the Central Press Association in 1927, which was purchased in 1930 by King Features Syndicate.

The strip had several toppers during its run: Etta Kett Play Fashions, How to Draw Cartoons and Lovebyrds.

The strip came to an end two months after Robinson died on September 21, 1974. The last daily appeared November 23, 1974, with the final Sunday strip published one day later.

Characters and story
Launched as a single panel during December 1925, it originally offered tips to teenagers on manners, etiquette and the social graces. Robinson, however, saw a narrative potential that went beyond the initial format, devising a strip of wholesome humor that maintained a readership over five decades. Drawing with a polished, clean-line style, he jettisoned the teen-tips to expand his teenage characters into a daily strip and Sunday page about energetic Etta Kett and her middle-class family and friends in a suburban setting.

Etta Kett came along six years after Carl Ed's Harold Teen and displayed certain parallels, notably activities set inside the Sugar Shack soda shop rather than the Sugar Bowl soda shop of Harold Teen. As Peter Kylling observed, Robinson also borrowed from his earlier strip, The Love-Byrds:

The brunette Etta and her boyfriend Wingey Wallace experienced an endless round of activities and events, such as soda fountain sessions at the Sugar Shack (where Wingey worked), rooting for the home team at the football field, arranging dates, pulling pranks and heading off for the rodeo. Comics historian Andy Madura commented, "Beginning in late 1925, Etta Kett was another of the flapper strips stemming from the 1920s. Like those that survived the era, Etta Kett had to metamorphosize away from the frivolous flapper mentality to attract Great Depression and beyond readers. For Etta Kett this was largely accomplished by putting Etta into a more college-like setting and making her the proper opposite to her somewhat wolfish boyfriends."

During the 1930s fad for comic strip paper novelties, Robinson added play money and paper dolls to his full-size Etta Kett pages. Peter Kylling noted how the strip kept up with current fads and trends:

Critical reaction 
In Toonopedia, comics historian Don Markstein described the art style and the essence of the strip:

Comic books

Four issues of an Etta Kett comic book (numbered 11 through 14) were published by Standard Comics in 1948, all displaying the cover blurbs: "This Is a King Features Comic" and "Teen Age Darling of Millions of Readers".

A coloring book, Color the Comics with Etta Kett and Her Friends from the Famous Comic Strip, was published by Saalfield in 1960.

In popular culture 
In 1957, Harvey Kurtzman lampooned the strip in his satirical Trump magazine.

See also
Aggie Mack
Carl Ed
Freckles and His Friends
Harold Teen
Marty Links
Penny
Teena
Zits

References

External links
The Comics by Coulton Waugh (1947)
Etta Kett Pinbacks
Lambiek: Paul D. Robinson

1925 comics debuts
1972 comics endings
Kett, Etta
American comic strips
Comics about women
Kett, Etta
Kett, Etta
Gag-a-day comics
Teen comedy comics
Kett, Etta